Blake Lunsford Workman (August 12, 1908 – June 9, 1983) was an American football player. He played college football at Decatur Baptist College and the University of Tulsa and professional football in the National Football League (NFL) as a back for the Cincinnati Reds in 1933 and the St. Louis Gunners in 1934. He appeared in seven NFL games, four as a starter.

References

1908 births
1983 deaths
Tulsa Golden Hurricane football players
Cincinnati Reds (NFL) players
St. Louis Gunners players
Players of American football from Texas
Decatur Baptist College alumni